Kundera is a Czech surname. It may refer to:

Ludvík Kundera (1920–2010), Czech writer and translator, cousin of Milan Kundera
Ludvík Kundera (musicologist) (cs) (1891–1971), Czech musicologist and pianist who was head of the Janáček Academy of Music and Performing Arts, father of Milan Kundera
Milan Kundera (b. 1929), a European writer
Rudolf Kundera (fr) (1911-2005), Czech-French painter

See also
 Lena Kundera and Bianca Montgomery, fictional characters
 7390 Kundera, asteroid
 Kundra